Marau Wawa is an extinct language once spoken on Marau Island, off Makira in the Solomon Islands.  (The island was actually named Wawa; marau just means "island".)  The last speaker was old in 1919; the island had been abandoned after a raid some years earlier.  The language may have been one of the Makira languages, but it was quite distinct.

References

Languages of the Solomon Islands
Malaita-San Cristobal languages
Extinct languages of Oceania